The Center Area School District is a defunct school district formerly covering Center Township and Potter Township in Beaver County, Pennsylvania.  The district formerly operated Center High School, Center Middle School, Todd Lane Elementary School and Center Grange Primary School.  In 2009 the district consolidated with the former Monaca School District to form Central Valley School District.

2009 disestablishments in Pennsylvania
School districts disestablished in 2009
School districts in Beaver County, Pennsylvania